Hans Andersen is the name of:

Hans Christian Andersen (1805–1875), Danish fairy tale writer 
Hans Henrik Andersen (1937–2012), Danish physicist
Hans Andersen (speedway rider) (born 1980), Danish speedway rider
Hans Georg Andersen (1919–1994), Icelandic diplomat
Hans Niels Andersen (1852–1937), Danish shipping magnate and businessman
Hans C. Andersen, American chemist from Stanford University, 1976 Guggenheim Fellow
Hans Andersen (politician), Danish politician
Hans Andersen (footballer, born 1905)
Hans Andersen (footballer, born 1925), Norwegian footballer
Hans Andersen (footballer, born 1939), Danish footballer